Grant Thomas Stevenson (born October 15, 1981) is a Canadian former professional ice hockey forward who played in the National Hockey League (NHL) with the San Jose Sharks during the 2005–06 season.

Playing career
Stevenson was born in Spruce Grove, Alberta. After winning the "player of the year" award with the Spruce Grove Midget AAA team, Stevenson joined the Bonnyville Pontiacs of the Alberta Junior Hockey League (AJHL) for the 1999–00 season. He recorded 20 and 38 assists in 63 games in his rookie season and was his team's "rookie of the year". He also played in the AJHL Prospects Game. In 2000–01, Stevenson played for the Grande Prairie Storm of the AJHL and improved on his totals with 22 goals and 67 assists in 62 games, and he played in the AJHL All-Star game.

Recruited by Minnesota State University, Mankato for the 2001–02 season, Stevenson finished 8th in WCHA Rookie Scoring with 8 goals and 8 assists in 38 games, winning "rookie of the week" twice. Breaking out next year as the highest scoring sophomore in the nation with 27 goals and 36 assists in 38 games, Stevenson was second on the team and 5th in the nation in scoring. Consequently, Stevenson garnered many weekly honors and was named to the WCHA First All-Star Team.

Leaving college two years early, Stevenson signed with San Jose Sharks as a free agent on April 18, 2003.

In 2003–04, his first pro season, Stevenson posted 39 (13 + 26) points in 71 games for the Cleveland Barons, and also recorded seven assists in nine playoff games. Playing with former Minnesota State Mavericks teammate Shane Joseph signed to a PTO contract March 15, Stevenson garnered five goals and 11 assists in 14 games. Stevenson's powerful chemistry with Joseph helped earn him a contract with the Barons' NHL team, the San Jose Sharks.  Stevenson, however, failed to make significant progress the following season; playing poorly for the Barons, Stevenson was demoted to the Johnstown Chiefs of the ECHL, where he finished the 2004–05 season with 14 goals, and 25 assists in 77 games.

Following his "sophomore slump," Stevenson worked out hard in the summer to gain more strength and speed.  His efforts seemed to pay off, as he rebounded with 16 points in 17 games for the Barons in 2005–06 before being called up to San Jose on November 23, 2005. Stevenson finished his first NHL season with 10 goals and 12 assists in 47 games.  Despite his decent stats as an NHL rookie, Stevenson did not play an NHL game the following season, partly due to the emergence of other young San Jose forwards.

On July 4, 2007, Stevenson signed with the Calgary Flames as a free agent. He spent the year with the Flames affiliate the Quad City Flames of the AHL. On July 9, 2008, Stevenson was again on the move signing for the Atlanta Thrashers as a free agent.

For the season 2009–10, Stevenson left North America and signed a one-year contract with Swiss team EHC Kloten of the National League A on June 24, 2009. After only 3 appearances with the Flyers, he was surprisingly cut from the team due to the falling short of the Flyers ambitious expectations. Stevenson returned to the American Hockey League signing with the Hamilton Bulldogs for the remainder of the season on November 23, 2009. Grant tallied just 8 goals in 53 games with the Bulldogs but raised his play in the playoffs scoring 10 points in 19 games to help Hamilton reach the Western Conference finals of the Calder Cup.

On July 29, 2010, Stevenson opted for his second foray into Europe signing as a free agent with German team Augsburger Panther of the DEL.

Personal information
He is the grandson of NHL Hall of Famer Glenn Hall.

Awards and honours

1998–99: Spruce Grove's Midget AAA-Player of the Year
1999–00: Bonneyville's Rookie of the Year
1999–00: AJHL Prospect Game
2000–01: Grande Prairie's Top Forward
2000–01: AJHL All-Star Game.
2002–03: Jofa Second All-American Team.

Career statistics

References

External links

1981 births
Augsburger Panther players
Canadian ice hockey right wingers
Chicago Wolves players
Cleveland Barons (2001–2006) players
Hamilton Bulldogs (AHL) players
Ice hockey people from Alberta
Johnstown Chiefs players
EHC Kloten players
Living people
Minnesota State Mavericks men's ice hockey players
People from Spruce Grove
Quad City Flames players
San Jose Sharks players
Undrafted National Hockey League players
Worcester Sharks players
Minnesota State University, Mankato alumni
Bonnyville Pontiacs players
Grande Prairie Storm players
Canadian expatriate ice hockey players in Germany
Canadian expatriate ice hockey players in Switzerland
Canadian expatriate ice hockey players in the United States
AHCA Division I men's ice hockey All-Americans